Oceans of the Mind was a quarterly online science fiction magazine published in 2001–2006.

History and profile
The first issue, appeared in Fall 2001, was published in print version, then it was released in PDF format via e-mail. The magazine was published by Trantor Publications in Jacksonville, FL. Each themed issue focused on some aspect of the future, such as space colonization, future crime, spirituality, or the military. The magazine folded with the Spring 2006 issue due to a lack of subscriptions.

See also
 List of defunct American periodicals

References

External links
Official site

2001 establishments in Florida
2006 disestablishments in Florida
Online magazines published in the United States
Quarterly magazines published in the United States
Defunct science fiction magazines published in the United States
Magazines established in 2001
Magazines disestablished in 2006
Magazines published in Florida
Mass media in Jacksonville, Florida